John Alcock (born November 13, 1942) is an American behavioral ecologist and author. He is currently the Emeritus' Professor in the School of Life Sciences at Arizona State University.

His research interests include the evolution of diversity in insect populations, studying the adaptive value of different ways in which males find mating partners. He has authored several books, including The Kookaburras' Song: Exploring Animal Behavior in Australia (1988), Sonoran Desert Summer (1990), The Triumph of Sociobiology (2003), and Animal Behavior: An Evolutionary Approach (tenth edition, 2013). He authored Sonoran Desert Spring (1994) which was illustrated by Marilyn Hoff Stewart, and also authored In a Desert Garden: Love and Death Among the Insects (1999) illustrated by Turid Forsyth.

Alcock is one of the original scientists to participate in the Ask A Biologist program and continues to participate in interviews as well as answering questions from students around the world.

Alcock has performed extensive research and is the leading authority on the bee Centris pallida which is common in Arizona. Most of this research was performed in the late 1970s.

He completed his undergraduate degree at Amherst College (1965) and his Ph.D. at Harvard University (1969).

Books
 Animal Behavior: An Evolutionary Approach, Sinauer Associates. Sunderland, 2013, 
 An Enthusiasm for Orchids: Sex and Deception in Plant  Evolution, Oxford University Press, US, 2005, 
 The Triumph of Sociobiology, Oxford University Press, US, 2003,

References

External links

 Biology Net - Ask A Biologist podcast interview of John Alcock
 Cowpies, Termites a Main Attraction - Ask A Biologist children profile of John Alcock
 Arizona State University Profile Page

1942 births
Living people
Arizona State University faculty
John Burroughs Medal recipients
Harvard Graduate School of Arts and Sciences alumni
American ecologists
Amherst College alumni